Caac or Caaàc, Caawac, Moenebeng, Mwelebeng is a Kanak language of northern New Caledonia. As of 2009, there were 1,170 reported speakers of Caac.  The primary Caac-speaking population center is the village of Pouebo (or Pweevo in Caac), which is located on the northeastern coast of Grande Terre in the region of Hoot ma Waap. Caac is classified as an Extreme Northern New Caledonian language. Its closest linguistic relatives are also its closest geographic relatives which include Nêlêmwa-Nixumwak, Yuanga (also Yuaga) and Nyâlayu.

While most of the Caac-speaking people live in Hoot ma Waap, it is estimated that approximately 33% of the population live in the Noumea region, largely in the Paita-Mont Dore area of the capital. The first Caac speakers arrived in Noumea in the 1850s when Marist missionaries forced 120 people from Pouebo and Balade to accompany them to La Conception, the local designation for Paita-Mont Dore. This long historical separation between the groups has resulted in two Caac varieties. Differences have largely arisen in the phonology because of the southern variety's contact with the languages of southern New Caledonia, which have distinct phonological inventories from that in the north.

Reports tend to agree that Caac is threatened or vulnerable. Caac is largely only used with family and in social and customary contexts. Caac speakers are almost entirely multilingual minimally in Caac and French, though many also speak one or more of the neighboring languages. French plays a particularly heightened role in the lives of the Kanak people. It is the only official language of New Caledonia, despite the presence of 28 Kanak languages, and it is the language of media, government, public services, and education. As of 1998, the Kanak languages have been recognized as "languages of culture and education" by the Noumea Accords. As a result, today, many Kanak languages are taught in schools, and their use in media is growing. Caac is no longer taught in schools, but in the 1980s and 90s it was taught in an alternative school that was organized by Caac speakers. More recently it was taught in a private secondary school. Despite efforts to incorporate Kanak languages into the curriculum, French remains paramount. As such, many speakers of Kanak languages, including Caac, are prioritizing French for their children so that they may be able to obtain an education and a good job. Because of this, young speakers have only a passive knowledge of Caac.

Phonology

Caac has 27 consonant phonemes. Stops may be plain voiceless, aspirated, or prenasalized. The table contains both the IPA notation and the graphemes that correspond to the Caac orthography promoted by the Association Vaalija in Pouebo.

Caac has a series of five vowels that contrast based on nasalization and length. Nasalized vowels occur more-rarely than oral vowels. Oral vowels phonetically nasalize in one of two instances: 1) when preceded by a labio-velar consonant and 2) when followed by a nasal or prenasal consonant. There are also two central oral vowels that are restricted in their occurrence.

Grammar
Basic word order in Caac is VOS. However, when the subject is pronominal, it also occurs preverbally sVO.

 sVo Word order

As is common among Oceanic languages, Caac distinguishes three persons and three degrees of plurality. It additionally distinguishes inclusive and exclusive first person dual and plural forms.

References

New Caledonian languages
Languages of New Caledonia
Vulnerable languages